Adrienne Russell is an American academic whose work focuses on the digital-age evolution of journalism and activist communication. She is currently Mary Laird Wood Professor in the Department of Communication at the University of Washington and co-director with Matt Powers of the department's Center for Journalism, Media and Democracy.

Education and career
Russell earned a BA in World Literature and Cultural Studies from the University of California, Santa Cruz in 1993, an MS in Media Studies from Stanford University in 1995, and a PhD in Journalism and Mass Communication from Indiana University, Bloomington in 2001.  Following her PhD, Russell served as an assistant professor in the Department of Global Communication at the American University of Paris (2003 — 2005).  She was a research fellow at the Annenberg Center for Communication at the University of Southern California from 2005 until 2007.  She then moved to the University of Denver, where she had a joint appointment in Emergent Digital Practices and in the Media, Film, and Journalism department.  She then moved to the University of Washington, where she is Mary Laird Wood Professor of Communication.

Research

Russell's research centers on the digital-era evolving relationship between media and public culture. In her early work, she explored activist communication in relation to journalism, mapping the terrain of the expanding networked information-media landscape and investigating related shifting journalism norms and practices. In recent work, she presents environmental journalism as a rich site of innovation and chronicles the way reporters covering the environment have long worked a space rife with misinformation. Russell argues that the climate and information crises today are most productively viewed as inextricable parts of a single larger crisis in public communication and culture—that criticism of journalism for failing to convey persuasively the urgency of the climate crisis misses half the story.

Russell's 2016 book, Journalism as Activism: Recoding Media Power, seeks to update thinking about communication and politics in the mediated era. The book centers on an emerging vanguard of activists and journalists remaking communication tools and genres to better cover contemporary networked life.

Russell is a member of Media Climate, an international group of scholars conducting ongoing comparative research on news coverage of climate change.

She participated in a transnational research project on coverage of information on the US National Security Agency snooping programs leaked by Edward Snowden. The research results are detailed in the book Journalism and the NSA Revelations: Privacy, Security and the Press (Reuters Institute/I.B. Tauris book series 2016), which she co-edited with Risto Kunelius, Heikki Heikkila, and Dimitri Jagodin.

Russell's first book, Networked: A Contemporary History of News in Transition, examined the transformation of journalism since the mid-1990s.

Russell has edited special editions of the journals New Media and Society (2005) and Journalism: Theory, Criticism, Practice (2011). She was co-author of the book Networked Publics (MIT 2008), which examines the ways social and cultural shifts fostered by emergent technologies have transformed relationships with place, culture, politics and infrastructure. She co-edited with Nabil Echchaibi the book International Blogging: Identity, Politics and Networked Publics (Peter Lang 2009), which addresses the western-focus that has characterized much new-media research. In the introduction, she wrote that the book was "part of a larger effort in media studies to address the parochialism of much contemporary scholarship by considering media practices and products developed around the world," and that, "The proliferation of new forms and the rise of the audience as a major participant [highlights] the absurdity of theory elaboration based on isolated Western case studies."

Books

References

External links 
 
Media Climate

University of Denver faculty
University of California, Santa Cruz alumni
Stanford University alumni
Indiana University alumni
Living people
American mass media scholars
1971 births